{{DISPLAYTITLE:Phi2 Ceti}}

Phi2 Ceti, Latinized from φ2 Ceti), is a star located in the equatorial constellation of Cetus. φ2 Ceti is also known as 19 Cet, and HD 4813. Based upon parallax measurements, it is located about 51 light years away. It has an apparent visual magnitude of +5.19, making it bright enough to be seen with the naked eye. The star is drifting further away with a radial velocity of +8 km/s.

This is an ordinary F-type main sequence star with a stellar classification of F7V. The star is estimated to be 1.9 billion years old and is spinning with a projected rotational velocity of 4.3 km/s. It has 1.2 times the mass and 1.17 times the radius of the Sun. The star is radiating 1.85 times the luminosity of the Sun from its photosphere at an effective temperature of 6,352 K. It is a suspected variable star of unknown type, with a brightness that has been measured ranging from magnitude 5.15 down to 5.24.

References

Cetus, Phi2
Cetus (constellation)
Cetus, Phi2
BD-11 0153
Ceti, 19
0037
004813
003909
0235